The following list of Carnegie libraries in Nevada provides detailed information on United States Carnegie libraries in Nevada, where 1 library was built from 1 grant (totaling $15,000) awarded by the Carnegie Corporation of New York in 1902.

Carnegie libraries

Notes

References

Carnegie
Nevada
History of Reno, Nevada
Libraries
Libraries